Janapriya Higher Secondary School, formerly Janapriya Secondary School,  is a community-run non-profit higher secondary school in Hetauda, known for its technical education program in veterinary and agriculture, which is referred to, independently, as Janapriya Technical School. It is designated as one of the model public schools of the country by the federal government of Nepal.

Introduction
The school is located in Ward No. 16 of Hetauda Submetropolis, in Chisapani, Hatiya (formerly Hatiya VDC), about 6 km east of Hetauda proper. , the principal was Namaraj Aryal, while Loknath Chaulagain was the chairperson of the School Management Committee. It also has a students hostel.

History

Janapriya School started in 2033 BS, and lower secondary level education was formally started in 2034 BS. In 2052 BS, secondary level classes were formally started with the approval from District Education Office, Makwanpur. In 2062 BS, it started running agriculture and veterinary (technical) education classes affiliated with CTEVT.
It became a higher secondary school in 2063 BS when it was approved for 10+2 level by the Higher Secondary Education Board. It also runs bachelor level classes under affiliation of Tribhuvan University.

Model public school
Janapriya Secondary School was one of the first fourteen schools to be selected in the first phase of the Model Public School Programme of the Government of Nepal, which plans to develop 240 schools in the country into model schools with earth-quake resistant buildings and complete infrastructure including laboratories, libraries, hostels, sports facilities, drinking water and sanitation, etc. According to the Chair of School Management Committee, Loknath Chaulagain, the school has received a grant of Rs 120 Million from the Government of Nepal for its infrastructure development, under the model public schools programme. The grant was being used to build classrooms, laboratories, a conference room and student hostel buildings, . On 14 September 2019, the newly constructed building for its technical school was inaugurated by Minister of Education, Science and Technology, Giriraj Mani Pokharel. According to Aarthik Abhiyan, the total cost of the newly completed infrastructure handed over to the community amounted to Rs 102.5 Million. According to Thaha Khabar, Janapriya School is being developed into a model public school by the assistance of Asian Development Bank.

Janapriya Technical School
Janapriya Secondary School started its technical education program in 2061 BS. The technical school provides 18 month diploma courses in veterinary and agriculture (JTA). The program takes admissions from secondary level students who fail to acquire their SEE diplomas, providing them with a second chance for education and skilled employment. According to principal Namaraj Aryal, more than 2,000 agricultural technicians had successfully graduated from the technical school . There were 400 students from 38 districts enrolled in the school as of that year. The school runs agricultural and livestock farms to provide practical education to its students, they sell their produces to the local market. Due to high application rates, the school conducts entrance examinations for prospective students prior to admission.

See also
 Education in Nepal

References

Secondary schools in Nepal
1976 establishments in Nepal